SNZ  was a Brazilian girl group formed in Rio de Janeiro in 1997 by the sisters Sarah Sheeva, Nãna Shara and Zabelê Gomes, daughters of the musicians Baby do Brasil and Pepeu Gomes.

Discography
 SNZ (2000)
 Sarahnãnazabelê (2001)
 Zunzum e Pronto (2007)

References

Brazilian girl groups
Musical groups established in 1997
Musical groups disestablished in 2009
Vocal trios
Musical groups from Rio de Janeiro (city)
Brazilian dance music groups
Brazilian pop music groups
Teen pop groups
Brazilian vocal groups